Hemmatabad (also Romanized as Hemmatābād; also known as Himmatābād) is a village in Rostaq Rural District, in the Central District of Saduq County, Yazd Province, Iran. At the 2006 census, its population was 367, in 103 families.

References 

Populated places in Saduq County